The following outline is provided as an overview of and topical guide to Togo:

Togo – sovereign country located in West Africa bordering Ghana to the west, Benin to the east and Burkina Faso to the north.  The country extends south to the Gulf of Guinea, on which the capital Lomé is located. The official language is French and many other languages are spoken as well.

General reference 

 Pronunciation: 
 Common English country name:  Togo
 Official English country name:  The Togolese Republic
 Common endonym(s): 
 Official endonym(s):  
 Adjectival(s): Togolese
 Demonym(s):
 ISO country codes:  TG, TGO, 768
 ISO region codes:  See ISO 3166-2:TG
 Internet country code top-level domain:  .tg

Geography of Togo 

Geography of Togo
 Togo is: a country
 Population of Togo: 6,585,000  - 100th most populous country
 Area of Togo: 56,785 km2
 Atlas of Togo

Location 
 Togo is situated within the following regions:
 Northern Hemisphere and lies on the Prime Meridian
 Africa
 West Africa
 Time zone:  Coordinated Universal Time UTC+00
 Extreme points of Togo
 High:  Mont Agou 
 Low:  Bight of Benin 0 m
 Land boundaries:  1,647 km
 877 km
 644 km
 126 km
 Coastline:  Bight of Benin 56 km

Environment of Togo 

 Climate of Togo
 Geology of Togo
 Wildlife of Togo
 Fauna of Togo
 Birds of Togo
 Mammals of Togo

Natural geographic features of Togo 
 Glaciers in Togo: none 
 Rivers of Togo
 World Heritage Sites in Togo

Regions of Togo

Ecoregions of Togo 

List of ecoregions in Togo

Administrative divisions of Togo 

Administrative divisions of Togo
 Regions of Togo

Provinces of Togo 

Provinces of Togo

Districts of Togo 

Districts of Togo

Municipalities of Togo 

Municipalities of Togo
 Capital of Togo: Lomé
 Cities of Togo

Demography of Togo 

Demographics of Togo

Government and politics of Togo 
Politics of Togo
 Form of government: presidential republic
 Capital of Togo: Lomé
 Elections in Togo
 Political parties in Togo

Branches of the government of Togo 

Government of Togo

Executive branch of the government of Togo 
 Head of state: President of Togo,
 Head of government: Prime Minister of Togo,

Legislative branch of the government of Togo 
 Parliament of Togo (bicameral)
 Upper house: Senate of Togo
 Lower house: House of Commons of Togo

Judicial branch of the government of Togo 

Court system of Togo

Foreign relations of Togo 

Foreign relations of Togo
 Diplomatic missions in Togo
 Diplomatic missions of Togo

International organization membership 
The Togolese Republic is a member of:

African, Caribbean, and Pacific Group of States (ACP)
African Development Bank Group (AfDB)
African Union (AU)
African Union/United Nations Hybrid operation in Darfur (UNAMID)
Commonwealth of Nations
Conference des Ministres des Finances des Pays de la Zone Franc (FZ)
Council of the Entente (Entente)
Economic Community of West African States (ECOWAS)
Food and Agriculture Organization (FAO)
Group of 77 (G77)
International Atomic Energy Agency (IAEA)
International Bank for Reconstruction and Development (IBRD)
International Chamber of Commerce (ICC)
International Civil Aviation Organization (ICAO)
International Criminal Police Organization (Interpol)
International Development Association (IDA)
International Federation of Red Cross and Red Crescent Societies (IFRCS)
International Finance Corporation (IFC)
International Fund for Agricultural Development (IFAD)
International Labour Organization (ILO)
International Maritime Organization (IMO)
International Monetary Fund (IMF)
International Olympic Committee (IOC)
International Organization for Migration (IOM)
International Organization for Standardization (ISO) (correspondent)
International Red Cross and Red Crescent Movement (ICRM)
International Telecommunication Union (ITU)
International Telecommunications Satellite Organization (ITSO)

International Trade Union Confederation (ITUC)
Inter-Parliamentary Union (IPU)
Islamic Development Bank (IDB)
Multilateral Investment Guarantee Agency (MIGA)
Nonaligned Movement (NAM)
Organisation internationale de la Francophonie (OIF)
Organisation of Islamic Cooperation (OIC)
Organisation for the Prohibition of Chemical Weapons (OPCW)
Permanent Court of Arbitration (PCA)
Union of South American Nations (UNASUR)
United Nations (UN)
United Nations Educational, Scientific, and Cultural Organization (UNESCO)
United Nations Industrial Development Organization (UNIDO)
United Nations Mission in Liberia (UNMIL)
United Nations Operation in Cote d'Ivoire (UNOCI)
Universal Postal Union (UPU)
West African Development Bank (WADB) (regional)
West African Economic and Monetary Union (WAEMU)
World Confederation of Labour (WCL)
World Customs Organization (WCO)
World Federation of Trade Unions (WFTU)
World Health Organization (WHO)
World Intellectual Property Organization (WIPO)
World Meteorological Organization (WMO)
World Tourism Organization (UNWTO)
World Trade Organization (WTO)

Law and order in Togo 

Law of Togo
 Constitution of Togo
 Human rights in Togo
 LGBT rights in Togo
 Law enforcement in Togo

Military of Togo 

Military of Togo
 Command
 Commander-in-chief:
 Forces
 Army of Togo
 Air Force of Togo

Local government in Togo 

Local government in Togo

History of Togo 

History of Togo
 Current events of Togo

Culture of Togo 

Culture of Togo
 Cuisine of Togo
 Languages of Togo
 National symbols of Togo
 Coat of arms of Togo
 Flag of Togo
 National anthem of Togo
 Prostitution in Togo
 Public holidays in Togo
 Religion in Togo
 Hinduism in Togo
 Islam in Togo
 World Heritage Sites in Togo

Art in Togo 
 Music of Togo

Sports in Togo 
 Football in Togo
 Togo at the Olympics

Economy and infrastructure of Togo 

Economy of Togo
 Economic rank, by nominal GDP (2007): 152nd (one hundred and fifty second)
 Agriculture in Togo
 Communications in Togo
 Internet in Togo
 Companies of Togo
Currency of Togo: Franc
ISO 4217: XOF
 Health care in Togo
 Mining in Togo
 Stock Exchange in Togo: none – country is served by the regional stock exchange Bourse Régionale des Valeurs Mobilières (BRVM) in Abidjan, Cote d'Ivoire.
 Transport in Togo
 Airports in Togo
 Rail transport in Togo

Education in Togo 

Education in Togo

See also 

Togo
Index of Togo-related articles
List of international rankings
List of Togo-related topics
Member state of the United Nations
Outline of Africa
Outline of geography

References

External links 

 Government
  Republic of Togo official site
  Web Radio Togo official Web Radio
  National Assembly of Togo official site

 Aid Work
 Apis-Togo.org - Association pour l'Alphabétisation et la Promotion des Infrastructures et de la Santé au Togo et en Afrique
  - Synergie des Jeunes pour Demain, la plus grande association de volontariat jeune pour le development.

 News
 AllAfrica.com - Togo news headline links
 IFEX - Togo alerts, news articles and dossiers

 Overviews
 BBC News Country Profile - Togo
 Encyclopædia Britannica, Country Page - Togo
 CIA World Factbook - Togo
 
 US State Department - Togo includes Background Notes, Country Study and major reports

 Sports
 Photo of the national football team

 Tourism
 
 Togo Woezon Tourism

Togo
Outline